The Conway Bridge is a historic road bridge that crosses the Nolichucky River between Greene County and Cocke County, Tennessee. It has also been known as Nolichucky River Bridge, as Bridge at Bird Hill, as Birds Hill Bridge and as Bridge at Conway Ferry.

It was built in 1924–5 to replace the Conway Ferry that crossed the river at that site. The ferry was replaced by a bridge when the construction of the upstream Nolichucky Dam changed the water level in the river.

A four-span closed-spandrel arch bridge, it was built by the Steel and Lebby Bridge Co. of Knoxville. It was listed on the National Register of Historic Places in 2009.

References

Road bridges on the National Register of Historic Places in Tennessee
Bridges completed in 1925
Buildings and structures in Cocke County, Tennessee
Buildings and structures in Greene County, Tennessee
National Register of Historic Places in Greene County, Tennessee
Arch bridges in the United States